John Wilson Lewis (November 16, 1930 – September 4, 2017) was an American political scientist who taught at Cornell University, before joining the faculty of Stanford University, where he became the William Haas Professor of Chinese Politics.

Career
A native of King County, Washington, Lewis graduated from Deep Springs College in 1949 before earning a bachelor's degree at University of California, Los Angeles. He returned to UCLA after serving in the United States Navy from 1954 to 1957. Lewis received a master's degree in 1958, and completed a Ph.D. in 1962. He specialized in China–United States relations and the Korean conflict, inspired to research those topics by relatives who worked as missionaries in China and his time in the military, respectively. He began teaching at Cornell in 1961, and left for Stanford in 1968. At Stanford, Lewis became founding director of the Center for East Asian Studies, serving until 1970 when he started the Center for International Security and Arms Control, which later became the  Center for International Security and Cooperation in 1983. From 1983 to 1990, Lewis led what became the Walter H. Shorenstein Asia-Pacific Research Center.

Lewis married his wife Jacquelyn in 1954, with whom he had three children. He lived on the Stanford University campus, where he died at the age of 86 on September 4, 2017.

References

1930 births
2017 deaths
American political scientists
American sinologists
Cornell University faculty
Deep Springs College alumni
International relations scholars
Koreanists
People from King County, Washington
Stanford University faculty
United States Navy sailors
University of California, Los Angeles alumni